The Fat Lady Sings were a rock band from Dublin, Ireland, fronted by singer and songwriter Nick Kelly. Almost immediately after forming in March 1986, they relocated to London, and remained there for the rest of their career. Despite this, they consistently enjoyed more media attention and commercial success in their native Ireland, with a series of five top 20 singles in 1990/91, than they did in the UK.

Career
The band remained self-financed and self-managed for eighteen months, building a substantial live following, including sold-out gigs at London's Town & Country Club (now The Forum) and Dublin's National Stadium. Having released a string of critically acclaimed singles on independent labels, The Fat Lady Sings signed to East West Records. In October 1990, they released their first major label single "Man Scared", followed by the debut album Twist in May 1991. Twist spawned three more singles: a re-release of “Arclight” (April 1991), “Twist” (May 1991) and “Deborah” (August 1991). The second album Johnson was produced by Steve Osborne and with Nic France replacing founding member Robert Hamilton on drums, was released in June 1993, following the lead single "Show of Myself". The second single, "Drunkard Logic", became the band's highest UK chart position, peaking at no. 56 in July 1993. The band spent six months on tour promoting Johnson, including three months in the US, concluding with a final show in New York's CBGB in December 1993. In January 1994 the band split when frontman and only songwriter Nick Kelly surprisingly quit the band.

In 2005, the band reformed for a one-off show at Dublin's Vicar Street and released the two-album compilation The Fat Lady Sing(le)s / Opera Oscura containing singles, B-sides and rarities on Warner Bros. Records.

Post-TFLS careers 

In 1993, drummer Robert Hamilton, who left before the second album, and Ali McMordie set up the charity project Peace Together, which released a compilation album including versions of the TFLS track "Be Still" featuring Elizabeth Fraser, Peter Gabriel, Nanci Griffith, Clive Langer, Sinéad O'Connor, Feargal Sharkey, and Jah Wobble.

Guitarist Tim Bradshaw and bassist Dermot Lynch enjoyed chart success in America as members of the band Dog's Eye View in 1995. Subsequently, Bradshaw worked as a session and live musician, producer and arranger for Tanita Tikaram, The Fatima Mansions and David Gray. Lynch also played for David Gray and went on to work as a tour and production manager for Keane, Fun Lovin' Criminals and Supergrass.

Singer and songwriter Nick Kelly released his first solo album, Between Trapezes, independently in 1997, and became the Best Solo Male Artist at the 1998–99 Irish Music Critics Awards. In 2005, he released his second album, Running Dog, on his own label. More recently, he has recorded with the project Alien Envoy, who released the album Nine Lives in 2010. Kelly also works as a commercial director.

Personnel
Nick Kelly – Lead vocals
Tim Bradshaw – Guitar
Dermot Lynch – Bass
Robert Hamilton – Drums

Discography

Singles

Albums
Twist (1991)
Johnson (1993)

References

External links 

Musical groups established in 1986
Musical groups from Dublin (city)